Phyllonorycter ermani is a moth of the family Gracillariidae. It is known from the island of Hokkaidō in Japan and the Russian Far East.

The wingspan is 7-8.5 mm.

The larvae feed on Alnus maximowiczii and Betula ermanii. They mine the leaves of their host plant. The mine has the form of a ptychonomous leaf mine on the space between two veins of the lower surface of the leaves.

References

erinaceae
Moths of Asia

Leaf miners
Moths of Japan
Insects of Russia
Moths described in 1963
Taxa named by Tosio Kumata